The 2002 Men's Asian Games Rugby sevens Tournament was held in Ulsan Public Stadium from September 30 to October 1, 2002.

Squads

Results
All times are Korea Standard Time (UTC+09:00)

Preliminary

Group A

Group B

Classification (5–6)

Final round

Semifinals

Classification (3–4)

Final

Final standing

References
2002 Asian Games Official Report, Page 568

External links
 2002 Asian Games website

Men Sevens